Fleetwood Weekly News is a weekly newspaper based in Fleetwood, Lancashire, England published every week, on a Wednesday, which covers Fleetwood and North Fylde.

The newspaper is published by Blackpool Gazette & Herald Ltd who also publish the daily Blackpool Gazette and the weekly Lytham St. Annes Express. All three are owned by JPIMedia.

References

External links
Official website

Weekly newspapers published in the United Kingdom
Newspapers published in Lancashire
Publications established in 1984
Fleetwood
Newspapers published by Johnston Press